Donald McCallister (March 13, 1904 – August 5, 1977) was an American football player and coach. He served as the head football coach at South Carolina University from 1935 to 1937 and at Norwich University in Northfield, Vermont from 1938 to 1941, compiling a career college football coaching record of 32–29–2. As a high school coach at Waite High School in Toledo, Ohio, McCallister's 1932 squad won a mythical High School Football National Championship.

McCallister died on August 5, 1977, as San Gabriel Community Hospital in San Gabriel, California.

Head coaching record

College

References

1904 births
1977 deaths
Illinois Fighting Illini football players
Norwich Cadets athletic directors
Norwich Cadets football coaches
South Carolina Gamecocks athletic directors
South Carolina Gamecocks football coaches
High school football coaches in Florida
High school football coaches in Ohio
Sportspeople from Illinois